The Lake Chad attack was a terrorist attack on the Niger side of Lake Chad by 30 members of Boko Haram, an Islamic sect in northeastern Nigeria.

Incident
The incident was reported to have occurred on February 25, 2014 and was launched by members of the insurgents in Northeastern Nigeria.
Sophisticated weapons were used in the attack, leaving scores of civilians and 7 soldiers dead.
Since the sects had been designated by the US as a "terrorist" organisation in 2009, they had carried out several cross-border attacks but the February 25, 2014 Lake Chad attack was the first attack on the Republic of Chad.

See also
Wuse bombing

References

Boko Haram attacks
Massacres perpetrated by Boko Haram
February 2014 crimes in Africa
2014 in Nigeria
Attacks in Nigeria in 2014